Erdeč  is a village in the municipality of Stanovo, Serbia. According to the 2017 census, the village has a population of 7500 people.

References

Populated places in Šumadija District